West Island School (WIS) is a co-educational, private, international secondary school in Hong Kong which provides an English-language education to students of all abilities from age eleven to eighteen with a "modern liberal education" based on British-influenced international curricula. The campus is a purpose-built development located at 250 Victoria Road,  on the slopes of Mount Davis on Hong Kong Island. Students from Years Seven to Nine study the West Island School Middle Years Diploma; students in Years Ten to Eleven follow either the IGCSE, or the MYP IB Middle Years Programme; and students in Years Twelve to Thirteen follow the IB Diploma curricula. The school is a member of the English Schools Foundation, and as such still receives a small but symbolic subvention from the Government that has been frozen since the 1997 Handover of Hong Kong.

History
West Island School, began when the English Schools Foundation recognised a need for a new school on Hong Kong Island in the late-1980s; after Island School and South Island School. This was because of the recent residential boom in  Discovery Bay, which then had no secondary school to cater for the growing need of English language secondary school education on the outlying islands. After government approval of a site and funding in November 1990, plans for West Island School began in earnest, with the school operating as an offshoot of Island School at a temporary home; the old military hospital in Borrett Road, Mid-Levels.

West Island's first intake was in September 1991, when eighty-four Year 7 students were enrolled in four classes. In the meantime, work progressed on a purpose-built school in Pokfulam, designed by award-winning architect Patrick Lau, who was responsible for two other international schools in Hong Kong, the Lycée Français International Victor Segalen in Tai Hang and the American Hong Kong International School in Tai Tam.

In September 1994, the new purpose-built building opened. This consisted of a ten-storey building consisting of three blocks: housing classrooms, laboratories, an auditorium and a 25-metre indoor pool, linked together by open-air walkways and air-conditioned faculty-corridors.

Over the years, renovations further increased the usability of the building, although by 2001 the school was getting rather crowded with over 1,000 students enrolled; paving the way for the creation of a fourth block. This new addition opened for use in September 2003.

Curriculum
The school offers secondary education from Years 7 to 13, for pupils aged 10–19. West Island School students follow the International General Certificate of Secondary Education program in Years 10-11 and pursue the IB Diploma and BTEC Extended Diploma in Years 12–13.

The schools also offers AS-Level courses for Year 10 students pursuing in the study of critical thinking and entrepreneurship. 
 
The grades achieved by West Island students in IGCSE and IB examinations place them generously above similar schools across the world. In 2011, around 60% of IGCSE passes were at A* or A.

West Island also offers extracurricular activities run by both staff and students. Furthermore, students also have the opportunity to compete with other teams from other international schools as well as local schools from across Hong Kong and the region.

West Island School also participates in sports, with the school's track, swimming, field hockey, volleyball, martial arts, and netball teams placing well in HKSSF rankings. West Island School's football team has participated in 4 HKSSF finals in the last 5 years, and won three gold medals. In 2011, the school won the BOCHK Bauhinia Bowl, as the highest ranked co-educational school in Hong Kong.

School Council
WIS is a member school of the English Schools Foundation. WIS is governed by the "School Council" composed of teachers, parents, and management staff.

See also
English Schools Foundation
Island School
South Island School

References

Secondary schools in Hong Kong
English Schools Foundation schools
Educational institutions established in 1991
Sandy Bay, Hong Kong
International Baccalaureate schools in Hong Kong
1991 establishments in Hong Kong